The 2011 Dalian Shide F.C. season was Dalian's 22nd consecutive season in the top division of Chinese football.

Overview
South Korean manager Park Sung-hwa remained at the beginning of the season. He wanted to build his team style by trusting South Korean players and put team captain Zhang Yaokun to the reserve team, while made many changes to the technical staff. This caused many conflict between him and the rest of the team. In May, after losing 3 goals to Shandong Luneng Taishan, Dalian Shide fired Park, and brought Portuguese Nelo Vingada instead. They merely escaped from relegation, ended up 12th in the league.

Players
As of 29 March 2011

Chinese Super League

League table

Fixtures and results

Chinese FA Cup

References

Dalian Shide F.C. seasons
Dalian Shide F.C.